Bindass Play was a Hindi Indian music television channel based in India, owned by The Walt Disney Company (India). The channel was launched on 1 October 2014 and replaced an HD Bollywood news and entertainment channel, UTV Stars.

The channel was shut down on 29 October 2017 and has been replaced with Disney International HD, the first Disney-branded HD channel in India. Bindass Play content will move to the Bindass channel, which is getting a re-brand.

References

Television channels and stations established in 2014
Television stations in Mumbai
Defunct television channels in India
Television channels and stations disestablished in 2017
Disney India Media Networks